Tri-Cities most often refers to:

Tri-Cities, Tennessee, United States
Tri-Cities, Washington, United States

Tri-City, Tricity or Tri-Cities may also refer to:

Populated places

Americas

Canada
Tri-Cities (British Columbia), consisting of Coquitlam, Port Coquitlam, and Port Moody, located in the north-eastern section of Metro Vancouver
Tri-Cities (Ontario), consisting of Kitchener, Cambridge, and Waterloo

United States
 In California:
 Tri-Cities in Los Angeles County, California, refers to the Burbank, Glendale, and Pasadena area, particularly in the local real estate industry.
 Tri-City, San Diego County, California, Oceanside, Vista, and Carlsbad
 Tri-City area in the San Francisco Bay Area refers to the three neighboring cities Fremont, Newark, and Union City.
 Tri-Cities, Georgia, consisting of College Park, East Point, and Hapeville, all of which are near Hartsfield–Jackson Atlanta International Airport
 Tri-Cities, Illinois, in Kane County, Illinois, the county seat of Geneva and the nearby cities of Batavia, and St. Charles,
 In Michigan:
 Tri-Cities, Michigan, consisting of Bay City, Saginaw, and Midland in the Saginaw Valley
 Tri-Cities, used locally to refer to Grand Haven, Spring Lake, and Ferrysburg in West Michigan
 Tri-Cities, Nebraska in the south-central part of the state, Grand Island, Kearney, and Hastings
Tri-Cities, New Hampshire 
Rochester, Dover and Somersworth
 Tri-Cities, New Mexico, Farmington, Bloomfield, and Aztec
 In New York:
 Capital District, New York, consisting of Albany, Schenectady, and Troy
 Triple Cities, Binghamton, Endicott and Johnson City
 In North Carolina:
 Piedmont Triad in North Carolina, consisting of Greensboro, Winston-Salem, and High Point.
 Research Triangle in North Carolina, consisting of Raleigh, Durham, and Chapel Hill.
 Tri-Cities, Oklahoma, Tuttle, Newcastle, and Blanchard
 Tri-City, Oregon, a census-designated place (CDP) and unincorporated community in Douglas County, Oregon, United States, named for 3 cities: Myrtle Creek, Canyonville and Riddle.
 Lehigh Valley in Pennsylvania: Allentown, Bethlehem, and Easton
 Tri-Cities, Tennessee, Tennessee and Virginia, consisting of the three cities of Bristol, Kingsport, and Johnson City
 Golden Triangle (Texas) consisting of Beaumont, Port Arthur, and Orange.
 In Virginia:
 Historic Triangle, three historic colonial communities on the Virginia Peninsula, namely Jamestown, Williamsburg, and Yorktown
 Tri-Cities, Virginia, consisting of Petersburg, Colonial Heights, and Hopewell in the Greater Richmond Region
 Tri-Cities, Washington, consisting of Richland, Pasco, and Kennewick, Washington
 Tri-Cities metropolitan area, metropolitan area centered on Tri-Cities, Washington

Asia

India
Chandigarh Tricity, consisting of Chandigarh, Panchkula and Mohali. 
Noida Ghaziabad Tricity, consisting of Noida, Greater Noida and Ghaziabad.
Udupi Tri-City, consisting of Udupi, Manipal and Malpe
Warangal Tri-City, consisting of Warangal, Hanamkonda, and Kazipet.

Nepal
 Tricity, Nepal, consisting of the cities of Baglung, Beni and Kusma

Saudi Arabia
 Dammam metropolitan area, consisting of Dhahran, Dammam and Khobar in Saudi Arabia

United Arab Emirates
 Dubai-Sharjah-Ajman metropolitan area, consisting of Dubai, Ajman and Sharjah

Europe

Denmark 
 Triangle Region (Denmark) – Kolding, Vejle and Frederica (Danish: trekantsområde)

Poland
 Little Kashubian Tricity consisting of Wejherowo, Rumia and Reda
 Tricity, Poland consisting of Gdańsk, Gdynia and Sopot

Sweden 
 Trollhättan, Uddevalla and Vänersborg are called Tri-city as a combination

Switzerland-Germany-France 
 Dreyeckland – Basel (Switzerland), Weil am Rhein (Germany) and St.Louis (France)

United Kingdom
 West Yorkshire Urban Area, the cities of Wakefield, Leeds and Bradford

Sports
 Tri-Cities Blackhawks, former name of the Atlanta Hawks from 1946 to 1951
 Tri-City Americans, an ice hockey team in Kennewick, Washington.
 Tri-City Dust Devils, a minor league baseball team in Pasco, Washington, United States.
 Tri-City ValleyCats, a minor league baseball team in Troy, New York

Other uses
 Tri-City News, community newspaper for British Columbia's Lower Mainland
 Tri-City, the fictional setting of the computer game Need for Speed: Undercover
 Tricity Bendix, a brand of electrical appliances owned by Electrolux
 Yamaha Tricity, a tilting three-wheeled motor scooter

See also
 Quad Cities
 Tripoli (disambiguation)
 Twin cities
 Twin city (disambiguation)